Westside Connection was an American hip-hop supergroup formed by Mack 10, WC and Ice Cube. The group's debut album, Bow Down, reached the number 2 position on the Billboard 200 in 1996, going platinum that year.

Biography
Westside Connection began performing together in 1994, appearing on Mack 10's self-titled debut album, Mack 10, on the song "Westside Slaughterhouse". A few months later, the group again joined forces, this time appearing on WC's album, Curb Servin', on the song "West Up!". It was around this time the group began work on their debut album, Bow Down, which was released October 22, 1996.

Individually, Mack 10, WC and Ice Cube continued working on solo projects in between group albums. Together, as Westside Connection, they produced several songs released on film soundtracks and compilations including "Bangin'" (from West Coast Bad Boyz II), "Let It Reign" (from Thicker than Water) and "It's the Holidaze" (from Friday After Next).

On December 9, 2003, the group released their second album, Terrorist Threats, preceded by the lead single "Gangsta Nation", produced by Fredwreck and featuring Nate Dogg.

Mack 10 quit the group in 2005 due to a conflict with Ice Cube, and Westside Connection subsequently disbanded. However, Ice Cube and WC continued to collaborate, having since appeared on each other's albums.

In 2008, HipHopDX reported that Ice Cube and WC were planning to relaunch the Westside Connection project, with The Game being proposed as Mack 10's replacement (having appeared with WC on Ice Cube's album Raw Footage that same year), however the rumored relaunch never came to fruition. In an interview with VladTV in 2020, Mack 10 commented in retrospect that any reunion without his involvement would still require his being paid, as he owns the trademark on the group's name, due to their second album being released through his record label.

Discography

Studio albums

Compilation albums

Singles

As lead artist

As featured artist

Promotional singles

Guest Appearances

References

American musical trios
Gangsta rap groups
Hip hop groups from California
Hip hop supergroups
Ice Cube
Musical groups from Los Angeles
Priority Records artists
Rappers from Los Angeles